Eric Uglum (born November 22, 1961) is an American musician, vocalist, audio engineer and producer. He has had a very productive career in roots music performance and production and has toured world wide in the bluegrass and folk music genres as a solo artist and as a member of many bands. Uglum has been featured in Flatpicking Guitar Magazine, Bluegrass Today, Bluegrass Unlimited and Bluegrass Now magazine. He is owner-operator of New Wine Sound Studio and Mastering Lab in Southern California and has worked with many Grammy nominated artists including: Ralph Stanley, Alison Krauss, Sean Watkins, Sara Watkins, Darrell Scott, Stuart Duncan, Ron Block, Rob Ickes, Neal Casal, Sierra Hull, The Black Market Trust and Gonzalo Bergara. In 2016 Eric and Bud Bierhaus were included on the Grammy Ballot for Best Bluegrass Album for their CD release entitled, Traveled. In addition to working independently through his New Wine Sound Studio and Mastering Lab, Uglum is also a staff engineer at Blue Night Records.

Biography
Uglum was born November 22, 1961 as Eric Alfred Benjamin Lussky in Fort Campbell, Kentucky, United States, and was raised in Huntington Beach, California.

1982–1990
Uglum began his music career in Huntington Beach, California where he received his first guitar—a Guild D25M—at age 13. In 1982 he won the title of West Coast Flatpicking Guitar Champion.

In 1986 Uglum (guitar/lead vocal), Ron Block (guitar/vocals), and Mike Bub (bass) formed the band Weary Hearts. The band was later joined by Butch Baldassari (mandolin) and Chris Jones (guitar). In 1987 Weary Hearts released an album of traditional Gospel songs entitled "Faith is the Answer".

In 1988, after touring with Weary Hearts for two years, Uglum formed another band, New Wine. The lineup consisted of Eric Uglum (guitar/vocals), Ron Block (guitar/banjo/vocals), Sandra Block (bass/vocals) and Rob Ickes (dobro).

1991–1999
After Ron Block left Weary Hearts to pursue his career with Alison Krauss and Union Station, Uglum teamed up with Janet Beazley (banjo), Marshall Andrews (bass), and Bud Bierhaus (guitar) to form Copperline. They released an album entitled "Long, Long Way" and performed at the International Bluegrass Music Association conference in 1996.

In 1997, Uglum (guitar/mandolin/vocals) joined the traditional Southern California Bluegrass band, Lost Highway. The band featured Ken Orrick (guitar/vocals), Dick Brown (banjo), Marshall Andrews (bass) and Paul Shelasky (fiddle). The band toured extensively around the U.S., the United Kingdom, Canada, Europe and the Middle East.
In 2000 Lost Highway released "Lifetime of Sorrow" an album featuring Ralph Stanley on guest tenor vocal.

2000–present
Uglum released his first solo album, "Shenandoah Wind", in January 2004. The album features guests such as Alison Krauss (singing harmony), Ron Block, Rob Ickes and Stuart Duncan.

In 2006, Uglum joined three bands in a tour which brought traditional American bluegrass music to The Sultanate of Oman. The bands, all from Southern California, were Lost Highway, Chris Stuart & Backcountry, and Eric Uglum & Sons. While in Oman, the bands performed at the Muscat Festival, a cultural event celebrating diversity in the Omani populace. The tour also included concerts and workshops for schools, and performances for the American Embassy staff and private interests.

In 2007 Uglum (guitar) joined Chris Stuart (guitar/ lead vocals), Janet Beazley (banjo) and his stepsons Austin Ward (upright bass) and Christian Ward (fiddle) in the band, Chris Stuart & Backcountry. The band has released three albums to date entitled "Mojave River", "Crooked Man" and "Saints and Strangers".

Also in 2007, Uglum began performing in a trio with his stepsons Austin Ward (bass) and Christian Ward (fiddle). The trio toured nationally and released an album produced by Janet Beazley entitled, "The Old Road to Jerusalem".

New Wine Sound Studio and Mastering Lab
In 1997, he began engineering and producing out of his New Wine Sound Studio and Mastering Lab in Southern California. Clients have included The Black Market Trust, Sierra Hull, Sean Watkins and many more.

Uglum continues to operate New Wine Sound Studio and is currently touring with Bud Bierhaus & The Vintage Martins. Their debut album entitled, Traveled was released 2016 and includes guest artists Rob Ickes, Ron Block, Christian and Austin Ward.

Partial discography

Solo albums 
2004: Shenandoah Wind  – Primary Artist: Guitar, Mandolin, Vocals, Harmony Vocals, Engineering, Mixing, Mastering

Other credits and contributions 
2015: Debby Clinkenbeard – Waiting on the Wind Featuring Neal Casal – Mixing, Mastering, Engineer, Lead/Rhythm Guitar 
2013: Ron Block – The Walking Song – Mixing
2012: Gonzalo Bergara Quartet – Walking Home – Mixing, Engineer
2012: Gonzalo Bergara Quartet – Simplicated  – Mixing, Engineer
2009: Cathy-Anne McClintock – Cathy-Anne McClintock – Engineer, Guitar (Acoustic), Mixing, Mastering
2009: Lee Watson and The Panthers – "Northern Track" – Mastering, Post Production
2009: The Breakmen —When You Leave Town – Mastering
2008: Sierra Hull –  Secrets – Mixing, Mastering
2008: Lost Highway –  A Bluegrass Gospel Collection –  Guitar, Mandolin, Mastering, Tenor (Vocal), Vocals
2008: Various – The Bluegrass Tribute to Jack Johnson – Engineer, Guitar, Mandolin, Mixing
2007: Eric Uglum & Sons – The Old Road to Jerusalem (2007) – Guitar, Mandolin, Vocals, Harmony Vocals, Engineering, Mixing, Mastering
2007: Cliff Wagner –  My Native Mind –  Guitar, Tenor (Vocal)
2007: Ron Block –  DoorWay –  Engineer, Production Assistant
2007: Greg Spatz – Fiddler's Dream  – Mastering
2007: Sally Jones –  Songs About US –  Engineer, Guitar, Mixing, Producer, Vocal Harmony
2005: Lost Highway –  A Bluegrass Gospel Collection –  Guitar, Mandolin, Mixing, Tenor (Vocal)
2003: Chris Stuart  – Saints and Strangers –  Mastering, Mixing
2002: Chris Stuart  – Angels of Mineral Springs –  Guitar (Acoustic), Guitar (Electric), Mandolin, Vocal Harmony
2002 Highway 52 - Silver Quarter 
2002: Ken Orrick  – Pictures and Stories –  Engineer, Guitar, Mandolin, Mastering, Mixing, Producer, Tenor (Vocal)
2001: Ron Spears  —Grandpa Loved the Carolina Mountains –  Engineer, Mixing
2001: Ron Block –  Faraway Land –  Engineer, Production Assistant
2001: Sean Watkins—  Let It Fall –  Engineer, Mixing
2000: Lost Highway –  A Lifetime of Sorrow –  Engineer, Guitar, Mandolin, Mixing, Tenor (Vocal)
2000: Lost Highway –  Headin' Down That Lost Highway –  Engineer, Mixing, Producer, Vocals
2000: Kevin Buchanan  —Silvertown –  Mastering
1990: Butch Baldassari  —Old Town – Guitar (Rhythm)
1990: Don and the Roping Dummies  —Don and the Roping Dummies – Engineer
1990: Joe Reese  — Fashioned Too Fragile – Engineer
1990: Many Voices, One Heart  – More Than This - Engineer, Mixing, Mastering 
1990: Scott Arthur —Road Less Traveled – Engineer, Guitar, Mandolin, Mastering, Mixing, Producer
1990: The Restless Hillfillies – Mastering
1990: Walden Dahl – Walden Dahl'' – Mastering

References

External links
 Eric Uglum's official website
 The Vintage Martins
Debby Clinkenbeard

1961 births
Living people
American country singer-songwriters
Country musicians from Kentucky
American bluegrass guitarists
American male guitarists
American male singer-songwriters
Bluegrass musicians from Kentucky
People from Huntington Beach, California
Singer-songwriters from California
Songwriters from Kentucky
Guitarists from California
Guitarists from Kentucky
20th-century American guitarists
Country musicians from California
20th-century American male musicians